Roos is a village and civil parish in the East Riding of Yorkshire, England.

History 
The de Ros family originated from the village of Roos.  Robert de Ros (died 1227) was one of the twenty-five barons appointed under clause 61 of the 1215 Magna Carta agreement to monitor its observance by King John of England.

Geography

The civil parish is formed by the villages of Roos, Hilston and Tunstall, together with the hamlet of Owstwick. According to the 2011 UK census, Roos parish had a population of 1,168, an increase on the 2001 UK census figure of 1,113.

The Prime Meridian crosses the coast to the east of Roos.

The parish church of All Saints is a Grade I listed building.

Governance
Roos is represented locally by Roos Parish Council while at county level is in the South East Holderness ward of the East Riding of Yorkshire Council. At a parliamentary level it is part of the Beverley and Holderness constituency which is represented by Graham Stuart of the Conservative Party.

In popular culture 
The meeting of Beren and Luthien in J. R. R. Tolkien's The Silmarillion and The Lord of the Rings, was written after the author and his wife visited a wood near to Roos. The "hemlocks" in the wood were said to have inspired his verse.

References

External links

Villages in the East Riding of Yorkshire
Holderness
Civil parishes in the East Riding of Yorkshire